The Viking Fund Medal is an annual award given out by the Wenner-Gren Foundation for Anthropological Research for distinguishing research or publication in the field of Anthropology. From 1946 to 1961, nominees were selected by their respective societies: The American Anthropological Association, the Society for American Archaeology, and the American Association of Physical Anthropologists, respectively for the fields of General Anthropology, Archaeology, and Physical Anthropology. In 1961, the selection procedure was modified for international nominees selection to increase the number of qualified applicants; the Viking Fund Medal has no longer been awarded annually, due to the embezzlement SEK 40,000,000 from the foundation by the trustee, Birger Strid, who was convicted of financial irregularities in 1975, with many years between awards.

See also

 List of anthropology awards
 List of archaeology awards

References 

Anthropology awards
Archaeology awards
Awards established in 1946